Hypericum adenotrichum, commonly known as kantaron, is a species of perennial flowering plant in the family Hypericaceae. It is native to  Turkey.

Description
Hypericum adenotrichum is a small plant, ranging  in height. It has numerous spreading stems with sessile, linear to oblanceolate leaves. The flowers have bright yellow petals, sometimes tinged with red, with up to 30 stamens.

Distribution and habitat
The species is native to Turkey, with possible sightings elsewhere due to garden escapes. It occurs in woodland and subalpine habitats.

Medicinal use
Many people use the plant in different folk medicines. It has also been looked into for its anti-cancer properties, including slowing the growth of cancer cell lines.

References

adenotrichum
Flora of Turkey
Plants described in 1836